The 2022–23 Bellarmine Knights men's basketball team represented Bellarmine University in the 2022–23 NCAA Division I men's basketball season. The Knights, led by 18th-year head coach Scott Davenport, played their home games at Freedom Hall in Louisville, Kentucky as members of the ASUN Conference. The Knights finished the season 15–18, 9–9 ASUN play to finish in a tie for seventh place. As the No. 8 seed in the ASUN tournament, they defeated North Florida before losing to Liberty in the quarterfinals. 

The Knights were in the third year of a four-year transition from Division II to Division I meaning that they were ineligible for the NCAA Tournament.

Previous season
The Knights finished the 2021–22 season 20–13, 11–5 in ASUN play to finish in second place in the West division. They defeated Florida Gulf Coast, Liberty, and Jacksonville to win the ASUN tournament championship. Because the Knights were in the second year of a four-year transition period from Division II to Division I, they were not eligible for NCAA postseason play. As a result, the conference's automatic bid to the NCAA tournament went to regular season champion Jacksonville State.

Preseason 
In the conference's preseason polls, the Knights were picked to finish fifth (media) and sixth (coaches) in the ASUN.

Roster

Schedule and results
In a story on the NCAA's official website, Knights head coach Scott Davenport commented on the team's late-November schedule:

|-
!colspan=12 style=|Exhibition

|-
!colspan=12 style=|Non-conference regular season

|-
!colspan=12 style=|ASUN regular season

|-
!colspan=12 style=| ASUN tournament

Sources

References

Bellarmine Knights men's basketball seasons
Bellarmine
Bellarmine Knights men's basketball